Pierre Stouppe (1690 – 6 January 1760) was a Swiss-born American educator.

References

American educators
1690 births
1760 deaths